Life  is the fifth album by French neoclassical metal band Adagio, released on 29 May 2017 in France under Zeta Nemesis Records label and 9 August 2017 in Japan by King Records.
The album fundings were raised after a crowdfunding campaign on IndieGogo collected €27,533.
It was recorded at Axone Studio in Montreuil, mixed at X-Fade Studios, Nanterre, and mastered at Tower Studio in Montpellier from 5 June to 18 October 2016.

Track listing

Personnel

Adagio 
 Kelly Sundown Carpenter –  vocals
 Stéphan Forté –  guitar
 Kevin Codfert –  keyboard
 Franck Hermanny –  bass guitar
 Jelly Cardarelli –  drums
 Mayline Gautié –  violin

Additional musicians 
 Carl Bensley – additional growling vocals

Production 
 Stéphan Forté – producer
 Kevin Codfert – mixing
 Brett Caldas-Lima – mastering
 Ludovic Cordelières – artwork
 Lulu Inthesky – artwork
 Martial Lenoir – photography

References 

2017 albums
Adagio (band) albums
Albums produced by Dennis Ward (musician)
Limb Music albums